Bernard Bertensohn (died 1859) was a Russian teacher and translator.

References
 

18th-century births
1859 deaths
19th-century educators from the Russian Empire
19th-century translators from the Russian Empire
Jews from the Russian Empire